High-top, High Top, Hi-Tops and Hitop may refer to:

High-top, a style of shoes
Hitop, West Virginia, an unincorporated community in Kanawha County
High Top, a Thoroughbred racehorse
Hi-Tops (film), a 1985 Christian movie

See also
Hi-top fade, a hairstyle